Mukim Lumapas is a mukim in Brunei-Muara District, Brunei.

Name 
The mukim is named after Kampong Lumapas, one of the villages it encompasses.

Geography 
The mukim is located in the south of the district, bordering the mukims within Kampong Ayer and Mukim Kianggeh to the north, Mukim Kota Batu to the north and east, Limbang District in Sarawak, Malaysia to the east and south, Mukim Pengkalan Batu to the west and Mukim Kilanas to the west and north.

Demographics 
As of 2016 census, the population was 7,756 with  males and  females. The mukim had 1,208 households occupying 1,187 dwellings. Among the population,  lived in urban areas, while the remainder of  lived in rural areas.

Villages 
As of 2016, the mukim comprised the following census villages:

Infrastructures 
As of 2004, the mukim had three primary schools, three secondary schools, four mosques, a post office and four police posts.

Public housing 
STKRJ Kampong Lumapas is the sole public housing estate within the mukim.

Schools 
Sayyidina Umar Al-Khattab Secondary School (SMSUA), located in Kampong Lupak Luas, was opened in 1994 and inaugurated on 6 August 1996. As of 2004, it had 1,208 students and 105 teachers. It was named after Umar, a prominent figure in the Islamic tradition who was a companion of prophet Muhammad as well as a Rashidun caliph.

Other locations
Other locations within the mukim include:
 Jong Batu, an island in the Brunei River

Notes

References

Lumapas
Brunei-Muara District